The Maya Award for Best Director is one of the Maya Awards presented annually since the awards debuted in 2012, that is initiated by FILM_Indonesia Twitter account.

The nominations and winners of the awards are selected by a panel of judges consisting of Indonesian film critics and filmmakers, including directors, actors, and actresses.

Winners and nominees

2010s

Multiple wins and nominations

The following individuals have received Best Director awards:

The following individuals have received multiple Best Director nominations:

References

Maya Awards (Indonesia)